Odette Joyeux (5 December 1914 – 26 August 2000) was a French actress, playwright and novelist.

Biography
She was born in Paris, where she studied dance at the Paris Opera Ballet before taking the stage. Joyeux started her film career in 1931. Her first notable film was Marc Allégret's Entrée des artistes (1938). During the 1940s  she established herself as one of France's most popular cinema actresses; however, she made few film appearances after the 1950s.

Joyeux is the author of some plays and essays on dance as well as a book on the life of inventor Nicéphore Niépce. She also wrote two novels aimed to inspire dance:  L'Âge heureux (which was adapted to a television series) and Côté jardin. Additionally, Joyeux wrote The Bride Is Much Too Beautiful (1956) (adapted to film).

She married actor Pierre Brasseur from 1935 until their divorce in 1945, by whom she had one child, Claude Brasseur, who is the father of Alexandre Brasseur.

In 1958 she married director Philippe Agostini. They remained married until her death in Grimaud, Var, Provence-Alpes-Côte d'Azur, France from stroke at age 85.

Partial filmography 

 Une femme a menti (1930)
 Le secret du docteur (1930) - Suzy, la bonne
 Jean de la Lune (1931) - Figurante (uncredited)
 Le chien jaune (1932) - (uncredited)
 Lake of Ladies (1934) - Carla Lyssenhop
 Le chant de l'amour (1935) - Tote
 Valse éternelle (1936) - Sophie
 Hélène (1936) - Françoise
 Une femme qui se partage (1937) - Léa
 Trois artilleurs au pensionnat (1937) - Micheline
 La Glu (1938) - Naïk
 Grisou (1938) - Madeleine
 Youth in Revolt (1938) - Zizi
 The Curtain Rises (1938) - Coecilia
 Notre-Dame de la Mouise (1941) - La môme
 Le Lit à colonnes (1942) - Marie-Dorée
 Les Mariage de Chiffon (1942) - Corysande dite Chiffon
 Lettres d'amour (1942) - Zélie Fontaine
 The Phantom Baron (1943) - Elfy de Saint-Hélié
 Love Story (1943) - Douce
 Les Petites du quai aux fleurs (1944) - Rosine Grimaud
 Échec au roy (1945) - Jeannette de Pincret
 Sylvie and the Ghost (1946) - Sylvie
 Messieurs Ludovic (1946) - Anne-Marie Vermeulen
 Lessons in Conduct (1946) - Micheline
 Passionnelle (1947) - Thérèse de Marsannes
 Scandale (1948) - Cécilia
 Dernière heure, édition spéciale (1949) - Andrée Coche
 Summer Storm (1949) - Marie-Blanche
 La Ronde (1950) - Anna, the Grisette
 If Paris Were Told to Us (1956) - La Passementière
 Love Is at Stake (1957, TV Movie) - Récitante (voice)
 A Golden Widow (1969, screenwriter)

Honours 
She was made Chevalier (Knight) of the Légion d'honneur on 29 November 1989, and promoted to Officier (Officer) in 1998.

She was made Officier (Officer) of the Ordre national du Mérite in 1994.

Notes

External links 

1914 births
2000 deaths
Actresses from Paris
French film actresses
French children's writers
French women children's writers
Officers of the Ordre national du Mérite
Prix Goncourt de la Biographie winners
Officiers of the Légion d'honneur
20th-century French actresses
20th-century French women writers